Manfred Poschenreider (born 31 March 1938) is a retired German motorcycle racer and competed in Grasstrack, Longtrack and Speedway.

World Longtrack Championship

European Finals
 1959  Helsinki (16th) 3pts
 1960 Did not compete
 1961  Oslo (4th) 3pts
 1962  Mühldorf (5th) 12pts
 1963  Malmö (Third) 10pts
 1964  Scheeßel (Third) 10pts
 1965 Qualifying Round
 1966  Mühldorf (Champion) 15pts
 1967  Scheeßel (Champion) 13pts
 1968  Mühldorf (Champion) 10pts
 1969  Oslo (8th) 15pts
 1970 Did not compete

World Finals
 1971  Oslo (Second) 26pts
 1972  Mühldorf (Second) 23pts
 1973  Oslo (Third) 20pts
 1974  Scheeßel (9th) 10pts
 1975  Gornja Radgona (10th) 9pts

West Germany Longtrack Championship
 1967  Munich (Second)
 1968  Jubek (Champion)
 1969  Vilshofen (Champion)
 1971  Jubek (First)
 1972  Pfarrkirchen (Third)
 1973  Ludinghausen (Second)

Speedway World Final appearances

World Pairs Championship
 1968 -  Kempten (with Fred Eberl) - 5th - 10pts (8)
* Unofficial World Championships.

References
 https://grasstrackgb.co.uk/manfred-poschenreider/
 http://www.historyspeedway.nstrefa.pl/zawodnik.php?imie=Manfred&nazwisko=Poschenrieder

1938 births
German speedway riders
Place of birth missing (living people)
Individual Speedway Long Track World Championship riders
Living people
People from Kempten im Allgäu
Sportspeople from Swabia (Bavaria)